Dermatoses of pregnancy are the inflammatory skin diseases that are specific to women while they are pregnant. While some use the term 'polymorphic eruption of pregnancy' to cover these, this term is a synonym used in the UK for Pruritic urticarial papules and plaques of pregnancy, which is the commonest of these skin conditions.

Skin diseases seen during pregnancy include:

See also 
 List of cutaneous conditions

References

External links 

Pregnancy-related cutaneous conditions